The Brigantine of New York is a 1924 German silent film directed by Hans Werckmeister and starring Lotte Neumann, Karl Beckersachs, and Elisabeth Pinajeff.

The film's sets were designed by the art director Gustav A. Knauer.

Cast

References

Bibliography

External links

1924 films
Films of the Weimar Republic
German silent feature films
Films directed by Hans Werckmeister
German black-and-white films